Cabo Frio (Cold Cape) is a tourist destination located in the state of Rio de Janeiro state. It was founded by the Portuguese on November 13, 1615.

The Brazilian coast runs east from Rio de Janeiro to Cabo Frio where it turns sharply north. North of Cabo Frio is Cabo de São Tomé.

It was named after the region where it's located, a peninsula or Cape (geography) and the water temperature is colder than in nearby cities (frio is Portuguese for "cold"). This city features beaches with white fine sand, since it doesn't have mica the sand doesn't get hot and you can walk on it with bare feet without getting burnt.

, Cabo Frio's estimated population is 230,378 and its area is 410 km².

Cabo Frio is served by Cabo Frio International Airport.

Geography

Climate

References

Much of the content of this article comes from the corresponding Portuguese-language Wikipedia article (retrieved on January 2, 2006).

External links
Cabo Frio Town Hall
Cabo Frio Legislative Chamber

Municipalities in Rio de Janeiro (state)
Populated coastal places in Rio de Janeiro (state)
Populated places established in 1615
1615 establishments in the Portuguese Empire